Fogelberg is a surname. Notable people with the surname include:

Bengt Erland Fogelberg (1786–1854), Swedish sculptor
Dan Fogelberg (1951–2007), American musician, songwriter, composer, and multi-instrumentalist